("Free Corps" or "Volunteer Corps") were irregular German and other European military volunteer units, or paramilitary, that existed from the 18th to the early 20th centuries. They effectively fought as mercenary or private armies, regardless of their own nationality. In German-speaking countries, the first so-called  ("free regiments", Freie Regimenter) were formed in the 18th century from native volunteers, enemy renegades, and deserters. These, sometimes exotically equipped, units served as infantry and cavalry (or, more rarely, as artillery); sometimes in just company strength and sometimes in formations of up to several thousand strong. There were also various mixed formations or legions. The Prussian  included infantry, jäger, dragoons and hussars. The French Volontaires de Saxe combined uhlans and dragoons.

In the aftermath of World War I and during the German Revolution of 1918–19,  consisting largely of World War I veterans were raised as  paramilitary militias. They were ostensibly mustered to fight on behalf of the government against the Russian Soviet Federative Socialist Republic backed German communists attempting to overthrow the Weimar Republic. However, many  also largely despised the Republic and were involved in assassinations of its supporters.

Origins 

The first  were recruited by Frederick the Great during the Seven Years' War. On 15 July 1759, Frederick ordered the creation of a squadron of volunteer hussars to be attached to the 1st Hussar Regiment (von Kleist's Own). He entrusted the creation and command of this new unit to Colonel Friedrich Wilhelm von Kleist. This first squadron (80 men) was raised in Dresden and consisted mainly of Hungarian deserters. This squadron was placed under the command of Lieutenant Johann Michael von Kovacs. They initially consisted of Prussian volunteers from Berlin, Magdeburg, Mecklenburg and Leipzig, but later recruited deserters. The  were regarded as unreliable by regular armies, so they were used mainly as sentries and for minor duties.

These early  appeared during the War of the Austrian Succession and especially the Seven Years' War, when France, Prussia, and the Habsburg monarchy embarked on an escalation of petty warfare while conserving their regular regiments. Even during the last Kabinettskrieg, the War of the Bavarian Succession,  formations were formed in 1778. Germans, Hungarians, Poles, Lithuanians, and South Slavs, as well as Turks, Tatars and Cossacks, were believed by all warring parties to be inherently good fighters. The nationality of many soldiers can no longer be ascertained as the ethnic origin was often described imprecisely in the regimental lists. Slavs (Croats, Serbs) were often referred to as "Hungarians" or just "Croats", and Muslim recruits (Albanians, Bosnians, Tatars) as "Turks".

For Prussia, the Pandurs, who were made up of Croats and Serbs, were a clear model for the organization of such "free" troops. Frederick the Great created 14 "free infantry" units, mainly between 1756 and 1758, which were intended to be attractive to those soldiers who wanted military "adventure", but did not want to have to do military drill. A distinction should be made between the  formed up to 1759 for the final years of the war, which operated independently and disrupted the enemy with surprise attacks, and the free infantry which consisted of various military branches (such as infantry, hussars, dragoons, jäger) and were used in combination. They were often used to ward off Maria Theresa's Pandurs. In the era of linear tactics, light troops had been seen necessary for outpost, reinforcement and reconnaissance duties. During the war, eight such volunteer corps were set up:

 Trümbach's  (Voluntaires de Prusse) (FI)
 Kleist's  (FII)
 Glasenapp's Free Dragoons (F III)
 Schony's  (F IV)
 Gschray's  (F V)
 Bauer's Free Hussars (F VI)
 Légion Britannique (FV - of the Electorate of Hanover)
 Volontaires Auxiliaires (F VI).

Because, with some exceptions, they were seen as undisciplined and less battleworthy, they were used for less onerous guard and garrison duties. In the so-called "petty wars", the  interdicted enemy supply lines with guerrilla warfare. In the case of capture, their members were at risk of being executed as irregular fighters. Their soldiers were given no entitlement to pensions or invalidity payments.

In France, many corps continued to exist until 1776. They were attached to regular dragoon regiments as jäger squadrons. During the Napoleonic Wars, Austria recruited various  of Slavic origin. The Slavonic Wurmser  fought in Alsace. The combat effectiveness of the six Viennese  (37,000 infantrymen and cavalrymen), however, was low. An exception were the border regiments of Croats and Serbs who served permanently on the Austro-Ottoman border.

Napoleonic era 
 
During Napoleon's 1812 invasion of Russia, the hussar Denis Davydov, a warrior-poet, formed volunteer partisan detachments functioning as Freikorps during the French retreat from Moscow. These irregular units operated in conjunction with Field Marshal Mikhail Kutuzov's regular Russian Imperial Army and Ataman Matvei Platov's Cossack detachments, harassing the French supply lines and inflicting defeats on the retreating Grande Armée in the battles of Krasnoi and the Berezina.

 in the modern sense emerged in Germany during the course of the Napoleonic Wars. They fought not so much for money but for patriotic reasons, seeking to shake off the French Confederation of the Rhine. After the French under Emperor Napoleon had either conquered the German states or forced them to collaborate, remnants of the defeated armies continued to fight on in this fashion. Famous formations included the King's German Legion, who had fought for Britain in French-occupied Spain and mainly were recruited from Hanoverians, the Lützow Free Corps and the Black Brunswickers.

The  attracted many nationally disposed citizens and students.  commanders such as Ferdinand von Schill, Ludwig Adolf Wilhelm von Lützow or Frederick William, Duke of Brunswick-Wolfenbüttel, known as the "Black Duke", led their own attacks on Napoleonic occupation forces in Germany. Those led by Schill were decimated in the Battle of Stralsund (1809); many were killed in battle or executed at Napoleon's command in the aftermath. The  were very popular during the period of the German War of Liberation (1813–15), during which von Lützow, a survivor of Schill's , formed his Lützow Free Corps. The anti-Napoleonic  often operated behind French lines as a kind of commando or guerrilla force.

Throughout the 19th century, these anti-Napoleonic  were greatly praised and glorified by German nationalists, and a heroic myth built up around their exploits. This myth was invoked, in considerably different circumstances, in the aftermath of Germany's defeat in World War I.

Freikorps poetry
The anti-Napoleonic guerrilla movements in Germany, Russia and Spain in the early 1810s also produced their own style of poetry, hussar poetry or Freikorps poetry, written by soldier-poets. In Germany, Theodor Körner, Max von Schenkendorff and Ernst Moritz Arndt were the most famous soldier-poets from the Freikorps. Their lyrics were for the most part patriotic, republican, anti-monarchical and anti-French. In Russia, the leader of the guerrilla army, Davydov, invented the genre of hussar poetry, characterised by hedonism and bravado. He used events from his own life to illustrate such poetry. Later, when Mikhail Lermontov was a junker (cadet) in the Russian Imperial Army, he also wrote such poetry.

1815–71 
Even in the aftermath of the Napoleonic era,  were set up with varying degrees of success.

During the March 1848 riots, student  were set up in Munich.

In 1864 in Mexico, the French formed the so-called Contreguerrillas under former Prussian hussar officer, Milson. In Italy, Guiseppe Garibaldi formed his famous Freischars, notably the "Thousand of Marsala", which landed in Sicily in 1860.

Even before the Franco-Prussian War of 1870/71,  were developed in France that were known as franc-tireurs.

Post–World War I 

After World War I, the meaning of the word Freikorps changed compared to its past iterations. After 1918, the term referred to various —yet, still, loosely affiliated — paramilitary organizations that sprang up across Germany following the country's defeat in World War I. Of the numerous Weimar paramilitary groups active during that time, the Freikorps were, and remain, the most notable. While exact numbers are difficult to determine, historians agree that some 500,000 men were formal Freikorps members with another 1.5 million men participating informally.

Amongst the social, political, and economic upheavals that marked the early years of the Weimar Republic, the tenuous German government under Friedrich Ebert, leader of the Social Democratic Party of Germany (SPD), utilized the Freikorps to quell socialist and communist uprisings. Minister of Defence and SPD member Gustav Noske also relied on the Freikorps to suppress the German Revolution of 1918-19 as well as the Marxist Spartacist League, culminating in the summary execution of revolutionary communist leaders Karl Liebknecht and Rosa Luxemburg on 15 January 1919.

Freikorps involvement in Germany and Eastern Europe

Bavarian Soviet Republic 
The Bavarian Soviet Republic was a short-lived and unrecognized socialist-communist state from 12 April 1919 - 3 May 1919 in Bavaria during the German Revolution of 1918-19. Following a series of political revolts and takeovers from German socialists and then Russian-backed Bolsheviks, Noske responded from Berlin by sending various Freikorps brigades to Bavaria in late April totalling some 30,000 men. The brigades included Hermann Ehrhardt's second Marine Brigade Freikorps, the Gorlitz Freikorps under Lieutenant Colonel Faupel, and two Swabian divisions from Württemberg under General Haas and Major Hirl as well as the largest Freikorps in Bavaria commanded by Colonel Franz Ritter von Epp.

While they were met with little Communist resistance, the Freikorps nonetheless acted with particular brutality and violence under Noske's blessing and at the behest of Major Schulz, adjutant of the Lützow Freikorps, who reminded his men that it "[was] a lot better to kill a few innocent people than to let one guilty person escape" and that there was no place in his ranks for those whose conscience bothered them. On 5 May 1919, Lieutenant Georg Pölzing, one of Schulz's officers, travelled to the town of Perlach outside of Munich. There, Pölzing chose a dozen alleged communist workers — none of whom were actually communists, but members of the Social Democratic Party — and shot them on the spot. The following day, a Freikorps patrol led by Captain Alt-Sutterheim interrupted the meeting of a local Catholic club, the St Joseph Society, and chose twenty of the thirty members present to be shot, beaten, and bayoneted to death. A memorial on Pfanzeltplatz in Munich commemorates the incident. Historian Nigel Jones notes that as a result of the Freikorps' violence, Munich's undertakers were overwhelmed, resulting in bodies lying in the streets and decaying until mass graves were completed.

Eastern Europe 
The Freikorps also fought against communists and Bolsheviks in Eastern Europe, most notably East Prussia, Latvia, Silesia, and Poland. The Freikorps demonstrated fervent anti-Slavic racism and viewed Slavs and Bolsheviks as "sub-human" hordes of "ravening wolves". To justify their campaign in the East, the Freikorps launched a campaign of propaganda that falsely positioned themselves as protectors of Germany's territorial hegemony over Lithuania, Latvia, and Estonia as a result of the Treaty of Brest-Litovsk and as defenders against Slavic and Bolshevik hordes that "raped women and butchered children" in their wake. Historian Nigel Jones highlights the Freikorps'"usual excesses" of violence and murder in Latvia which were all the more unrestrained since they were fighting in a foreign land versus their own country. Hundreds were murdered in the Freikorps' Eastern campaigns, such as the massacre of 500 Latvian civilians suspected of harbouring bolshevik sympathies or the capture of Riga which saw the Freikorps slaughter some 3,000 people. Summary executions via firing squads were most common, but several Freikorps members recorded the brutal and deadly beatings of suspected communists and particularly communist women.

Freikorps identity and ideals 
Freikorps ranks were composed primarily of former World War I soldiers who, upon demobilization, were unable to reintegrate into civilian society having been brutalized by the violence of the war physically and mentally. Combined with the government's poor support of veterans, who were dismissed as being hysterical when suffering from post-traumatic disorder, many German veterans found comfort and a sense of belonging in the Freikorps. Jason Crouthamel notes how the Freikorps' military structure was a familiar continuation of the frontlines, emulating the Kampfgemeinschaft (battle community) and Kameradschaft (camaraderie), thus preserving "the heroic spirit of comradeship in the trenches". Others, angry at Germany's sudden, seemingly inexplicable defeat, joined the Freikorps in an effort to fight against communism and socialism in Germany or to exact some form of revenge on those they considered responsible. To a lesser extent, German youth who were not old enough to have served in World War I enlisted in the Freikorps in hopes of proving themselves as patriots and as men.

Regardless of reasons for joining, modern German historians agree that men of the Freikorps consistently embodied post-Enlightenment masculine ideals that are characterized by "physical, emotional, and moral 'hardness'". Described as "children of the trenches, spawned by war" and its process of brutalization, historians argue that Freikorps men idealized a militarized masculinity of aggression, physical domination, the absence of emotion (hardness). They were to be as "swift as greyhounds, tough as leather, [and] hard as Krupp steel" so as to defend what remained of German conservatism in times of social chaos, confusion, and revolution that came to define the immediate interwar era. Although World War I ended in Germany's surrender, many men in the Freikorps nonetheless viewed themselves as soldiers still engaged in active warfare with enemies of the traditional German empire such as communists and Bolsheviks, Jews, socialists, and pacifists. Prominent Freikorps member Ernst von Solomon described his troops as "full of wild demand for revenge and action and adventure…a band of fighter…full of lust, exultant in anger." Expanding upon this, in Klaus Theweleit's two-volume study of Freikorps masculinity and identity, Male Fantasies, Theweleit argues that men in the Freikorps radicalized Western and German norms of male self-control, as well as about cold, tough, and hard masculinity, into a perpetual war against their very antithesis, women and femininity — most notably femininely-coded desires for domesticity, tenderness, and compassion within men. Historians Nigel Jones and Thomas Kühne agree with Theweleit's gendered framework of understanding masculinity within the Freikorps, noting that their displays of violence, terror, and male aggression and solidarity established the beginnings of the fascist New Man that the Nazis built upon.

Demobilization 
The extent of the Freikorps' involvement and actions in Eastern Europe, where they demonstrated full autonomy and rejected orders from the Reichswehr and German government, left a negative impression with the state. By this time, the Freikorps had served Ebert's purpose of suppressing revolts and communist uprisings. After the failed Kapp-Lütwitz Putsch in March 1920 that the Freikorps participated in, the Freikorps' autonomy and strength steadily declined as Hans von Seeckt, commander of the Reichswehr, removed all Freikorps members from the army and restricted the movements' access to future funding and equipment from the government. Von Seeckt was successful, and by 1921 only a small yet devoted core remained, effectively drawing an end to the Freikorps until their resurgence as far-right thugs and street brawlers for the Nazis beginning in 1923.

Affiliation with the Nazi Party 
The rise of the Nazi Party led to a resurgence of Freikorps activity, as many members or ex-members were drawn to the party's marrying of military and political life and extreme nationalism by joining the Sturmabteilung (SA) and Schutzstaffel (SS). Unlike in the German Revolution of 1918-19 or their involvement in Eastern Europe, the Freikorps now had almost no military value and were instead utilized by the Nazis as thugs to engage in street brawls with communists and to break up communist and socialist meetings alongside the SA to gain a political edge. Moreover, the Nazis elevated the Freikorps as a symbol of pure German nationalism, anti-communism, and militarized masculinity to co-opt the lingering social and political support of the movement. 

Eventually, Adolf Hitler came to view the Freikorps as a nuisance and possible threat to his consolidation of power. During the Night of the Long Knives in 1934, an internal purge of Hitler's enemies within the Nazi Party, numerous Freikorps members and leaders were targeted for killing or arrest, including Freikorps commander Hermann Ehrhardt and SA leader Ernst Röhm. In Hitler's Reichstag speech following the purge, Hitler denounced the Freikorps as lawless "moral degenerates…aimed at the destruction of all existing institutions" and as "pathological enemies of the state…[and] enemies of all authority," despite his previous public adoration of the movement.

Nazi Legacy 
Numerous future members and leader of the Nazi Party served in the Freikorps. Martin Bormann, eventual head of the Nazi party Chancellery and Private Secretary to Hitler joined the Gerhard Roßbach's Freikorps in Mecklenburg as a Section leader and quartermaster. Reich Farmers' Leader and Minister of Food and Agriculture Richard Walther Darré was part of the Berlin Freikorps. Reinhard Heydrich, future chief of the Reich Security Main Office (including the Gestapo, Kripo, and SD) and initiator of the Final Solution, was in the Georg Ludwig Rudolf Maercker's Freikorps as a teenager. Leader of the SS Heinrich Himmler enlisted in the Freikorps and carried a flag in the 1923 Beerhall Putsch. Rudolf Höss joined the East Prussian Volunteer Freikorps in 1919 and eventually became commander of the Auschwitz extermination camp. Ernst Röhm, eventual leader of the SA, supported various Bavarian Freikorps groups, funnelling them arms and cash. Although many high-ranking National Socialists were former Freikorps fighters, recent research shows that former Freikorps fighters were no more likely to be involved in National Socialist organisations than the average male population in Germany.

Freikorps groups and divisions 
 Iron Division (Eiserne Division, related to Eiserne Brigade and Baltische Landeswehr)
 Fought in the Baltic.
 Defeated by the Estonian Army and Latvian Army in the Battle of Cēsis
 Trapped in Thorensberg by the Latvian Army. Rescued by the Rossbach Freikorps.
 Volunteer Division of Horse Guards (Garde-Kavallerie-Schützendivision)
 Killed Rosa Luxemburg and Karl Liebknecht, 15 January 1919
 Led by Captain Waldemar Pabst
 Disbanded on order of Defence Minister Gustav Noske, 7 July 1919, after Pabst threatened to kill him
 Freikorps Caspari
 Fought against the Bremen Soviet Republic
 Fought under the command of Walter Caspari
 Freikorps Lichtschlag
 Fought against the Red Ruhr Army
 Fought under the command of Oskar von Watter
 
 Under the command of Franz Ritter von Epp
 Members include: Ernst Röhm, Rudolf Hess, Eduard Dietl, Hans Frank, Gregor Strasser and Otto Strasser.
 
 Occupied Munich following the revolution of April 1919.
 Commanded by Major Schulz
 Marinebrigade Ehrhardt (The Second Naval Brigade)
 Participated in the Kapp Putsch of 1920
 Disbanded members eventually formed the Organisation Consul, which performed hundreds of political assassinations
 Marinebrigade Loewenfeld (The Third Naval Brigade)
 Participated in the Kapp Putsch of 1920
  (Maercker's Volunteer Rifles, or )
 Founded by Ludwig Maercker
 Members include: Reinhard Heydrich, Eggert Reeder, Ernst von Salomon, Alfred Toepfer and Walter Warlimont
 Freikorps Oberland
 Kurt Benson
  (Rossbach)
 Founded by Gerhard Roßbach
 Rescued the Iron Division after an extremely long march across Eastern Europe.
 Members include: Kurt Daluege and Rudolph Hoess
 
 Formed by Czech German nationalists with Nazi sympathies which operated from 1938 to 1939
 Part of Hitler's successful effort to absorb Czechoslovakia into the Third Reich

World War II

During World War II, there existed certain armed groups loyal to Germany that went under the name "Freikorps". These include:
 Sudetendeutsches Freikorps, a German nationalist paramilitary that fought against Czechoslovakia for annexation of the Sudetenland into Germany.
 Free Corps Denmark, a Danish volunteer collaborationist group in the Waffen-SS that was founded by the National Socialist Workers' Party of Denmark, and participated in the invasion of the Soviet Union.
 British Free Corps, a British collaborationist Waffen-SS unit made up of British and Dominion prisoners of war.

Use in other countries

France
In France, a similar group (but unrelated to the Freikorps) were the "Corps Franc". Starting in October 1939, the French Army raised a number of Corps Franc units with the mission of carrying out ambush, raid, and harassing operations forward of the Maginot Line during the period known as the Phoney War (Drôle de Guerre). They were tasked with attacking German troops guarding the Siegfried Line. Future Vichy collaborationist, Anti-Bolshevik and SS Major Joseph Darnand was one of the more famous participants in these commando actions.

In May 1940, the experience of the Phoney War-era Corps Franc was an influence in creating the Groupes Francs Motorisé de Cavalerie (GFC) who played a storied role in the delaying operations and last stands of the Battle of France, notably in the defenses of the Seine and the Loire. Between April – September 1944, the Corps Franc de la Montagne Noire unit operated as part of the French Resistance.

Corps Francs d'Afrique 

On 25 November 1942, in the immediate aftermath of the Allied Invasion of Vichy French North Africa the Corps Francs d'Afrique (CFA) (African Corps Franc) was raised in French Morocco within the Free French Forces by General Giraud. Giraud drew the members of the all-volunteer unit from residents of Northern Africa of diverse religious backgrounds (Christian, Jew, and Muslim) and gave them the title of Vélite, a name inspired by the elite light infantry of Napoleon's Imperial Guard, who were named after the Roman Velites. Much of the Corps was drawn from Henri d'Astier de la Vigerie and José Aboulker's Géo Gras French Resistance Group which had been responsible for the Algiers Insurrection where the Resistance seized control of Algiers on the night of 8 November 1942 in coordination with the Allied landings happening that same night. In taking over Algiers, they managed to capture both Admiral Darlan and General Juin, which led to the Darlan Deal wherein Vichy French forces came over to the Allied side. Darlan was later assassinated by Fernand Bonnier de La Chapelle, an early member of the Corps Francs d'Afrique. They functioned as the Free French equivalent to the British Commandos. The Corps also included many Spanish and International old combatants of the Spanish Republican Army, which had sought refuge in Northern Africa in 1939.

The Corps Francs d'Afrique, under command of Joseph de Goislard de Monsabert, went on to fight Rommel's Afrikakorps in Tunisia with the U.S. 5th Army. They fought alongside the British 139th Brigade at Kassarine and Sidi Nasr, where they famously conducted a heroic bayonet charge, facing two to one odds, against the Italian 34th Battalion of the 10th Bersaglieri near the mountain of Kef Zilia on the road to Bizerte, taking 380 prisoners, killing the Italian battalion commander, and capturing the plans for Operation Ausladung. They participated in the capture of Bizerte in May 1943.

For its actions, the Corps Franc d'Afrique was awarded the Croix de Guerre.

The CFA formally was dissolved on 9 July 1943, with its members and equipment forming the corps of the newly created African Commando Group (GCA) on 13 July 1943 in Dupleix, Algeria, today seen as a forebear to the postwar Parachutist Shock Battalions and the modern day 13th RDP. The GCA went on to fight at Pianosa, Elba, Salerno, Provence, Belfort, Giromagny, Alsace, Cernay, Guebwiller, Buhl, and the Invasion of Germany.

See also 
Freikorps Awards
Landsknecht
List of defunct Paramilitary Organizations
 List of Free Corps
 List of Freikorps members
 List of paramilitary organizations
 Organisation Consul
 Freikorps Sauerland
 Battle of Annaberg
 Free Corps Denmark
 Viking League related Freikorps activities
 Free company Medieval units with some similarities
 Heimwehr

References 
Notes

Bibliography

External links 
 

 
Military units and formations established in 1759
1759 establishments in Prussia
1918 establishments in Germany
Military units and formations established in 1918
Military units and formations disestablished in 1939
1939 disestablishments in Germany
Anti-communism in Germany
Military history of Germany
Political repression in Germany
Terrorism in Germany
Counter-revolutionaries
German Revolution of 1918–1919
Right-wing politics in Europe